The Truman State University Index is a weekly student newspaper distributed at Truman State University and throughout the Kirksville, Missouri community. The publication is entirely student-run and funded mostly through its own advertising revenue. It has published continuously since 1909, and its current circulation is about 4,500.

The Index publishes about 14 issues per academic term for a total of 28 per year, on Thursdays, and does not publish when classes are not in session. An issue usually includes 20 pages.

Membership
Staff members of the Index attend conferences sponsored by the Society of Professional Journalists (SPJ) and College Media Advisers, Inc. and many belong to the Truman chapter of SPJ.

Recognition
The Index has won regional and national awards through SPJ and CMA, including the nationwide Apple Award by College Media Advisers in 2003, 2005, 2006, 2007 and 2009 in its category of best non-daily broadsheet newspaper and national Best in Show award, given by the CMA, in 2006.

The Index has been named a Pacemaker finalist, one of the most prestigious honors bestowed on collegiate media, by the Associated Collegiate Press seven of the last 10 years, in 1997, 1999, 2000, 2002, 2003, 2004 and 2005. 2007's finalists will be announced in the fall.

Individual staff members claimed 26 awards at the Missouri CMA conference in April 2007, which earned the Index the sweepstakes award, and 10 Mark of Excellence awards at the regional SPJ conference, also in April.

Competition
Although the Index is published in the same micropolitan area as the Kirksville Daily Express and they are therefore in nominal competition, the two newspapers often feature different content and focus. The Daily Express is published six times per week, its staff is smaller and it relies on wire content. The Daily Express also publishes stories relating to high school sports and other local events, while the Index tends to focus on events that relate to the university community.

Quality standards
The Index follows AP style and has developed its own Index stylebook so that references to campus and community events, places and traditions are standardized. Its staff is highly trained and expected to maintain the ethical standards of any professional media outlet.

The online version of The Index is hosted by College Publisher. In addition to viewing each week's stories and accessing an archive, readers can check for updates for breaking news.

References

External links
Truman State University Index online

Student newspapers published in Missouri
Truman State University
Publications established in 1909